Ghayas Zahid (born 8 September 1994) is a Norwegian professional footballer who plays as an attacking midfielder for Süper Lig club Ankaragücü and the Norway national team.

Club career
Zahid was born in Oslo to Pakistani parents. He played for Klemetsrud IF before he joined Vålerenga as a youth.

Zahid made his debut for Vålerenga on 10 August 2012, in a 3–1 win against Odd. 

He was loaned out to Adeccoligaen club Ullensaker/Kisa for the second half of the 2013 season. He made 10 appearances during his loan spell.

On 31 August 2017, it was announced that APOEL had secured his signature on a four-year contract until the end of May 2021, for an undisclosed transfer fee from Vålerenga.

On 23 July 2019, Panathinaikos announced the arrival of Zahid on loan from APOEL, with a purchase option of €1.6 million for the summer of 2020. The option was not triggered, and at the end of the season, he also left APOEL as his contract expired.

On 8 September 2021, Zahid signed a one-year contract with TFF First League club Ankaragücü, with an option for an additional year if the club wins promotion to the Süper Lig. He made his debut four days later, on 12 September, coming on as a substitute in the 61st minute for Abdullah Durak in a 2–0 win over Gençlerbirliği.

International career
On 6 June 2018, Zahid made his first appearance for Norway against Panama in an international friendly. He was substituted in the 89th minute. He had previously been called up by the Pakistan national football team to join their football camp.

Career statistics

International goals 
Scores and results list the Norway's goal tally first. Score column indicates score after each Zahid goal.

References

1994 births
Living people
Footballers from Oslo
Association football midfielders
Norwegian footballers
Norway youth international footballers
Norway under-21 international footballers
Norway international footballers
Vålerenga Fotball players
Ullensaker/Kisa IL players
Eliteserien players
Norwegian First Division players
APOEL FC players
Cypriot First Division players
Panathinaikos F.C. players
MKE Ankaragücü footballers
Super League Greece players
TFF First League players
Norwegian people of Pakistani descent
Norwegian expatriate footballers
Expatriate footballers in Cyprus
Norwegian expatriate sportspeople in Cyprus
Expatriate footballers in Greece
Norwegian expatriate sportspeople in Greece
Expatriate footballers in Turkey
Norwegian expatriate sportspeople in Turkey